Capulina Speedy González is a 1970 Mexican western-comedy film starring Gaspar Henaine in the title role and Leonorilda Ochoa with Víctor Alcocer and Julián de Meriche.

Directed, produced, and written by Alfredo Zacarías, the film revolves around the hilarious mishaps of a Mexican courier working for an American post office who is framed by two U.S. army deserters-turned-bandits.

Cast
Gaspar Henaine as Capulina Espiridión González 
Leonorilda Ochoa as Rosita Smith  
Xavier Loyá as Timothy 
Jorge Rado as Sheriff 
John Kelly as Sergeant
Víctor Alcocer as Priest 
Nathanael León as Bartender   
Conjunto "Los Tonchis" as Musician
Jorge Casanova as Mailman
Julián de Meriche as Judge
Juan Garza as Sheriff's assistant 
Jesús Gómez as Courier
Víctor Almazán as Townsman

External links

1970 films
1970s Western (genre) comedy films
Mexican Western (genre) comedy films
1970s Spanish-language films
1970 comedy films
1970s Mexican films